Odumase may refer to
Odumasi Krobo
Konongo-Odumasi